Vicarage Field is a cricket ground in Aberystwyth, Wales used by Glamorgan for two Sunday League matches in 1977 (against Essex) and 1989 (against Warwickshire). It was the host ground of the Olympic torch relay's 9th day Evening Celebrations featuring world class dance act Twist and Pulse

The ground hosted 2 List A matches.

Game Information:
{| class="wikitable"
|-
! Game Type
! No. of Games
|-
| County Championship Matches
| 0
|-
| Limited-over county matches
| 2
|-
| Twenty20 matches
| 0
|}

Game Statistics: one-day:
{| class="wikitable"
|-
! Category
! Information
|-
| Highest Team Score
| Essex (234/7 in 40 overs against Glamorgan) in 1977
|-
| Lowest Team Score
| Glamorgan (203/4 in 40 overs against Warwickshire) in 1989
|-
| Best Batting Performance
| Hugh Morris (83 Runs for Glamorgan against Warwickshire in 1989
|-
| Best Bowling Performance
| Gwyn Richards (3/42 for Glamorgan against Essex) in 1977
|}

External links
 Cricinfo Website - Ground Page
 Cricket Archive page

Sport in Aberystwyth
Cricket grounds in Wales
Glamorgan County Cricket Club